Saturdee is an Australian children's television series that first screened on the Seven Network in 1986, adapted from the novel by Norman Lindsay. The ten part series is set in the small town of Redheap in the 1920s and tells the story of 12-year-old Peter Gimble and his friends.

Saturdee was produced by Steve Vizard, directed by John Gauci and written by Judith Colquhoun and Peter Hepworth.

Cast
 Dominic McDonald as Peter Gimble
 Troy Sussman as Conkey Menders
 Tahnee Marks as Dolly Trimmer
 Tamsin West as Trixie
 Christine Amor as Ma Gimble
 Wade Coleman as Bluey

See also 
 List of Australian television series

References

External links
 
 Saturdee at the Australian Television Information Archive

Seven Network original programming
Australian children's television series
1986 Australian television series debuts
1986 Australian television series endings
English-language television shows
Norman Lindsay